Papagomys is a genus of very large rats in the tribe Rattini of the subfamily Murinae. It contains two species, which are known only from the Indonesian island of Flores:

Flores giant rat Papagomys armandvillei
Verhoeven's giant tree rat Papagomys theodorverhoeveni (extinct)
Both species have records extending to the early Late Pleistocene.

References

Literature cited
Aplin, K.P. and Helgen, K.M. 2010. Quaternary murid rodents of Timor. Part I: New material of Coryphomys buehleri Schaub, 1937, and description of a second species of the genus. Bulletin of the American Museum of Natural History 341:1–80.

Zijlstra, J.S., Hoek Ostende, L.W. van den and Due, R.A. 2008. Verhoeven's giant rat of Flores (Papagomys theodorverhoeveni, Muridae) extinct after all? Contributions to Zoology 77(1):25–31.

 
Rodent genera
Mammal genera with one living species